David Dennis Kagan (born November 9, 1949) is an American prelate of the Roman Catholic Church. He has been serving as bishop of the Diocese of Bismarck in North Dakota since 2011.

Biography

Early life and education 
David Kagan was born on November 9, 1949, in Waukegan, Illinois, and grew up in Spring Grove, Illinois. He received his primary education at Saint Peter School in Spring Grove. Kagan entered the Salvatorian Seminary in St. Nazianz, Wisconsin, and then studied philosophy at Loras College/St. Pius X Seminary in Dubuque, Iowa.

Priesthood 
Kagan was ordained into the priesthood by Bishop Arthur O'Neill on June 14, 1975, for the Diocese of Rockford.  After his ordination, Kagan served as parish vicar of Saint Patrick Parish in Dixon, Illinois, and as a teacher of religious education at Newman Central Catholic High School in Sterling, Illinois (1975–1977).  Kagan went to Rome in 1977 to enter the Pontifical North American College and Pontifical Gregorian University. He obtained a Licentiate of Canon Law from the Gregorian in 1979.  After returning to Illinois, Kagan held the following positions within the diocese:

 Teacher of religious education at Boylan Catholic High School in Rockford and vice-official of the diocesan tribunal (1979–1984)
 Judicial vicar (1984–1994)
 Parish administrator of Saint Anne Parish in Warren and of Saint Joseph Parish at Apple River (1984–1985)
 Chaplain at the Corpus Christi Monastery of the Poor Clares and parish vicar at St Peter's Cathedral Parish, both in Rockford (1985–1986) 
 Pastor of Saint Mary Parish in Byron and teacher of ethics at Saint Anthony College of Nursing in Rockford (1986–1989)
 Pastor of the Proto-Cathedral of St James in Rockford (1990–1994)

Kagan served as president of the presbyteral council and editor of the Diocesan weekly paper. He was admitted to the Equestrian Order of the Holy Sepulchre of Jerusalem as a knight commander in March 1995. In 1994, Kagan was named vicar general and moderator of the curia for the diocese by his bishop, as well as honorary prelate by the Vatican. In 2011, the Vatican elevated Kagan to protonotary apostolic.

Bishop of Bismarck 
Kagan was named bishop of the Diocese of Bismarck by Pope Benedict XVI on October 19, 2011, following the retirement of Bishop Paul Zipfel. He was consecrated at Bismarck's Cathedral of the Holy Spirit on Wednesday, November 30, 2011. Archbishop John Nienstedt was the principal consecrator. Bishop Zipfel and Bishop Thomas G. Doran were the principal co-consecrators. This was the first episcopal consecration at which Archbishop Carlo Vigano represented Pope Benedict XVI as apostolic nuncio to the United States.

See also

 Catholic Church hierarchy
 Catholic Church in the United States
 Historical list of the Catholic bishops of the United States
 List of Catholic bishops of the United States
 Lists of patriarchs, archbishops, and bishops

References

External links
Diocese of Bismarck
Catholic-Hierarchy

Episcopal succession

 

1949 births
21st-century Roman Catholic bishops in the United States
Living people
Roman Catholic Diocese of Rockford
People from Waukegan, Illinois
Roman Catholic bishops of Bismarck
Religious leaders from Illinois
Knights of the Holy Sepulchre
People from Spring Grove, Illinois
Catholics from Illinois